ADDitude is a quarterly consumer publication about attention deficit hyperactivity disorder (ADD ADHD) owned and operated by WebMD, LLC in New York, NY. It contains feature and service articles about ADD, ADHD and comorbid conditions including depression, anxiety, and learning disabilities like dyslexia. It addresses topics including: diagnosing ADHD in children and adults, attention-deficit hyperactivity disorder treatments including medication and/or alternative therapies, parenting children with ADHD, learning disabilities and school challenges, and living with adult ADD. ADDitude magazine is described by child psychotherapist Keath Low as "The happy, healthy lifestyle magazine for people with ADD."

The official web site for ADDitude magazine was launched in April 2007, and now contains free searchable archives, expert Q&As, ADHD bloggers and a directory of ADHD service providers.

History
ADDitude was founded by Ellen Kingsley (an Emmy-winning television journalist) in 1998 to serve the parents of America's 2-3 million schoolchildren with ADD and ADHD, as well as adults, with the disorder. Kingsley founded ADDitude as a web site a few years after her oldest son, Teddy, was diagnosed with severe ADHD. ADDitude became a print magazine two years later.

Kingsley died from breast cancer on March 8, 2007. In her honor, ADDitude magazine started the Ellen Kingsley Award for ADHD Advocacy the same year.

Staff
The ADDitude editorial and design staff includes:
 General manager: Anni Layne Rodgers
 Editor in chief: Carole Fleck
 Managing editor: Eve Gilman
 Editor: Nathaly Pesantez
 Senior editor: Melanie Wachsman
 Editorial Project Management Specialist: Carly Broadway
 Social media editors: Rebecca Brown Wright
 Copy editor: Gene Jones
 Advertising: Tracy Kennedy

Scientific advisory board
Members of the magazine's scientific advisory board review all scientific or medical information contained in ADDitude prior to publication:

Thomas E. Brown, Ph.D. (Yale University School of Medicine)
Russell Barkley, Ph.D. (Medical University of South Carolina)
William Dodson, M.D. (Dodson ADHD Center)
Ross W. Greene, Ph.D. (Lives in Balance)
Edward M. Hallowell, M.D. (The Hallowell Center)
Peter Jaksa, Ph.D. (ADD Centers of America)
Peter Jensen, M.D. (Center for the Advancement of Children's Mental Health, Columbia University College of Physicians and Surgeons)
Sandy Newmark, M.D. (Osher Center for Integrative Medicine)
Michele Novotni, Ph.D. (Wayne Counseling Center)
Roberto Olivardia, Ph.D. (Harvard Medical School)
J. Russell Ramsay, Ph.D. (Perelman School of Medicine)
Jerome Schultz, Ph.D. (Harvard Medical School)
Timothy Wilens, M.D. (Harvard Medical School)

ADDitudeMag.com
The official web site for ADDitude magazine was relaunched in April 2017, and now contains free searchable archives, expert Q&As, ADHD bloggers, and a directory of ADHD service providers.

References

External links 
 

Quarterly magazines published in the United States
Publications about attention deficit hyperactivity disorder
Health magazines
Magazines established in 1998
Magazines published in New York City